The 1930 Alberta general election was held on June 19, 1930, to elect members of the Legislative Assembly of Alberta.

The United Farmers of Alberta won election to a third term in government, and John E. Brownlee continued as premier.

This election, like the previous election (1926), used Single Transferable Voting in Edmonton and Calgary (Medicine Hat no longer had multiple seats). and used Alternative Voting in districts outside those two cities.

This provincial election, like the previous election, saw district-level proportional representation (Single transferable voting) used to elect the MLAs of Edmonton and Calgary (Medicine Hat no longer had multiple seats). City-wide districts were used to elect multiple MLAs in the two main cities. All the other MLAs were elected in single-member districts through Instant-runoff voting.

Th United Farmers again ran one candidate in Edmonton and won that seat and did not run in Calgary.

Altogether in the cities the UFA won just one seat in the cities (in Edmonton) but won a great share of the rural seats, by securing the support of a majority of votes in each district, as required under IRV (AKA Alternative Voting).

The effect of STV in the cities was that candidates of four parties - UFA, Conservative, Liberal and Labour - were elected in Edmonton reflecting votes cast.

STV in Calgary similarly produced mixed representation reflecting votes cast. Candidates of the Conservative, Liberal and Labour parties were elected there.

Results

Beaver River
The most closely contested race in the election happened in the Beaver River electoral district. The election was a three-way race between incumbent United Farmers MLA John Delisle Liberal candidate Henry Dakin and Independent candidate Luc Lebel.

The first count results showed Delisle leading Dakin by seven votes. Lebel was in third place with 87 votes. Under Instant runoff voting, when no candidate has a majority, the least-popular candidate is eliminated and his votes transferred. Lebel was eliminated and his 87 votes were transferred where second-choice preference had been marked. The new vote tallies showed Delisle with 21 more votes than Dakin. Delisle was declared elected on June 25, 1930, six days after the election was held.

The Liberals challenged the results in provincial court. A judicial recount was ordered. Judge Taylor concluded on August 21, 1930, that the second count results showed Dakin had four more votes than Delisle. Delisle's election was overturned, and Dakin picked up the seat.

Members elected

Edmonton and Calgary
The six front runners in the First Count in each city were elected in the end, after necessary vote transfers were conducted. Thus, the result under STV was the same as would have been the case if the election had been held using SNTV. Single voting in a six-seat district ensured mixed representation. In Edmonton, candidates of four parties were elected, representing a large majority of voters. In Calgary, candidates of three parties were elected, representing a large majority of voters.

References

Further reading

External links
Elections Alberta
Legislative Assembly of Alberta

Alberta
1930
1930 in Alberta
June 1930 events